Moshi Airport  is an airport in the Kilimanjaro Region of north-eastern Tanzania, serving the municipality of Moshi.

Airlines and destinations

See also

 List of airports in Tanzania
 Transport in Tanzania

References

External links
OurAirports - Moshi
OpenStreetMap - Moshi

Airports in Tanzania
Buildings and structures in the Kilimanjaro Region